Diocese of Madras may refer to:

 Diocese of Madras of the Church of South India
 Madras Orthodox Diocese
 Roman Catholic Archdiocese of Madras and Mylapore